Paul Seed (born 18 September 1947) is a British television director and former actor.

Born in Bideford in Devon, Seed began his career as an actor and appeared in numerous television series including Z-Cars, Softly Softly: Taskforce, Survivors, Doctor Who, Secret Army, Coronation Street, Crown Court and Tales of the Unexpected.  Seed currently lives in Torrington, Devon, and is married to actress Elizabeth Cassidy.

In the late 1970s, Seed chose to pursue a career in TV drama directing and completed the BBC Directors' course following which he directed numerous TV plays, series and serials during the 1980s. Seed directed the BBC's smash-hit 1990 mini-series House of Cards and its sequel To Play the King, adapted by Andrew Davies from Michael Dobbs' novels.

Seed continued to direct for television drama series throughout the 1990s including A Touch of Frost and Playing the Field, and in 2002 directed all six episodes of the revival of Auf Wiedersehen, Pet.

In recent years, he has directed episodes of New Tricks, Northern Lights, Doc Martin and Lark Rise to Candleford, and in 2010 directed the BBC adaptation of Just William, and also directed Blandings (2013), shown on BBC One.

External links
 

British television directors
People from Bideford
1947 births
Living people